Bolgary is the name of several rural localities in Russia:
Bolgary, Mari El Republic, a village in Mariysky Rural Okrug of Mari-Tureksky District in the Mari El Republic
Bolgary, Oryol Oblast, a village in Alyabyevsky Selsoviet of Mtsensky District in Oryol Oblast
Bolgary, Okhansky District, Perm Krai, a village in Okhansky District of Perm Krai
Bolgary, Permsky District, Perm Krai, a village in Permsky District of Perm Krai
Bolgary, Republic of Tatarstan, a selo in Spassky District of the Republic of Tatarstan
Bolgary, Vladimir Oblast, a village in Sobinsky District of Vladimir Oblast